Monseigneur Joseph-Eugène Limoges (November 15, 1879 – March 1, 1965) was a Canadian prelate who was Bishop of Mont-Laurier, Québec from 1922 to 1965.

Born in Sainte-Scholastique, he was ordained in 1902. Appointed bishop by Pius XI, he was consecrated by Bishop Joseph-Médard Émard. He died in 1965.

References
 Catholic-Hierarchy entry

1879 births
1965 deaths
20th-century Roman Catholic bishops in Canada
Participants in the Second Vatican Council
Roman Catholic bishops of Mont-Laurier